"Chinese fire drill" is a slang term for a situation that is chaotic or confusing, possibly due to poor or misunderstood instructions.

Origins 
The term goes back to the early 1900s, and is alleged to have originated when a ship run by British officers and a Chinese crew practiced a fire drill for a fire in the engine room. The bucket brigade were to draw water from the starboard side, pass it to the engine room, and pour it onto the simlated "fire". To prevent flooding, a separate crew was ordered to ferry the accumulated water from the engine room up to the main deck, and to heave the water over the port side. The drill had previously gone according to plan, until the orders became confused in interpretation. The bucket brigade began to draw the water from the starboard side, run directly over to the port side and then throw the water overboard, bypassing the engine room completely. 

Additionally, the term is documented to have been used in the US Marine Corps during World War II, where it was often expressed in the phrase "as screwed up as a Chinese fire drill". It was also commonly used by Americans during the Korean War and the Vietnam War.

Historians trace Westerners' use of the word Chinese to denote "confusion" and "incomprehensibility" to the earliest contacts between Europeans and Chinese people in the 1600s, and attribute it to Europeans' inability to understand China's radically different culture and world view. In his 1989 Dictionary of Invective, British editor Hugh Rawson lists 16 phrases that use the word "Chinese" to denote "incompetence, fraud and disorganization".

Other examples of such use include:
 "Chinese puzzle", a puzzle with a nonexistent or a hard-to-fathom solution.
 "Chinese whispers", a children's game in which a straightforward statement is shared through a sequence of players, one player at a time, until it reaches the end, often having been comically transformed along the way into a completely different statement. This game is also known as "telephone" in North America and "wire-less telephone" in Brazil.
 "Chinese ace", an inept pilot, derived from the term "one wing low" (which supposedly sounds like a Chinese name), an aeronautical maneuver.

Other uses 
The term can also refer to a prank originating in the 1960s in which the occupants of an automobile jump out, run around the vehicle, and jump back in at a different door, usually while at a red light or other form of traffic stoppage. This is sometimes also used to refer to a driver and passenger intentionally switching places in the middle of the road because the driver is having trouble with road conditions.

Offensiveness 
Public use of the has been considered to be offensive and racist. In 2017 a candidate for office in Nova Scotia, Matt Whitman, apologized for using the term in a video and subsequently removed the video. In 2020, Washington state Senator Patty Kuderer made an apology for using the term in a hearing; Linda Yang of Washington Asians for Equality stated that the term was racist and filed a complaint with the state. Kuderer apologized before any formal complaint was filed.

In popular culture 
A Chinese Firedrill is the name of a music project by Armored Saint and Fates Warning bassist Joey Vera. It released an album, Circles, in 2007. The album uses different musical foundations in each song, such that it is "chaotic or confusing", like a Chinese fire drill.

See also 
 List of practical joke topics
 Stereotypes of East Asians in the United States

References 

Practical jokes
Car games
Hazardous motor vehicle activities
Metaphors referring to objects